The men's flyweight event was part of the boxing programme at the 1928 Summer Olympics. The weight class was the lightest contested, and allowed boxers of up to 112 pounds (50.8 kilograms). The competition was held from Tuesday, August 7, 1928, to Saturday, August 11, 1928.

Results

The competition started with a controversial decision in the first round, when the American Hyman Miller was declared a surprise loser by points. The American boxing team in protest wanted to withdraw all its competitors. But Douglas MacArthur, at that time President of the U.S. Olympic Committee, wouldn't allow it, because "Americans never quit."

References

External links
 International Olympic Committee medal database
 Amateur Boxing

Flyweight